New Era is a barangay in Quezon City, Metro Manila, Philippines. It is noted for its dominant Iglesia ni Cristo population.

Geography
The Tandang Sora Avenue is situated on the northern and eastern boundary of New Era. The barangay is also bounded on the southeast by Commonwealth Avenue and on the south by Central Avenue. Sitio Mabilog is situated on its southwest boundary while lots no. 689, 680, 678, and 689 of the Piedad Estate and San Antonio Subdivision delineates New Era's eastern boundaries.

History
New Era was created by Presidential Decree No. 1760 which was issued by then-President Ferdinand Marcos on January 2, 1981. The barangay was carved from a portion of barangay Culiat. The Central Temple and the New Era University of the Iglesia ni Cristo which are situated within the barangay was inaugurated in 1984.

Demographics
About 95 percent of the barangay's population consists of members of the Iglesia ni Cristo. The Christian church host some of its significant facilities in the barangay such as its Central Office, Central Temple, and the New Era University. Part of the barangay is the Milton Hills Subdivision which were originally developed by Roman Catholics.

References

Quezon City
Barangays of Quezon City
Barangays of Metro Manila